Arima (有馬) is a Japanese surname.

Families 

 Hizen-Arima clan, a Japanese family of daimyo
 Murakami-Genji-Arima clan, a Japanese samurai family

People 
, Japanese nuclear physicist
, Japanese mathematician
Arima Noriyori (有馬 則頼, 1533–1603), Japanese daimyo of Sanda Domain
Arima Haruzumi (有馬 晴純, 1483–1566), Japanese feudal lord
Arima Harunobu (有馬 晴信, 1567–1612), Japanese daimyo of Shimabara Domain
Arima Naozumi (有馬 直純, 1586–1641), Japanese daimyo of Shimabara Domain
, Japanese former football player
, Japanese actress
, admiral and commander in the Imperial Japanese Navy
, Japanese voice actor
, Imperial Japanese Navy officer
, Japanese manga artist
, retired Japanese footballer
, Japanese football player
, admiral in the Imperial Japanese Navy
 Stafford Arima, Canadian-born theatre director
, President and Representative Director of the Fuji Xerox company
, Japanese politician
, Japanese footballer

Fictional characters
, the male protagonist in the anime and manga series Kare Kano
, a character from the anime series Tokyo Ghoul
, a character from the anime series Your Lie in April
Kana Arima, a character from the manga series Oshi no Ko

Japanese-language surnames